The Union for the Congolese Nation is a political party in the Democratic Republic of the Congo. It is led by Vital Kamerhe.

Kamerhe won 7.74% of the country's vote in the 2011 DR Congolese general election.

References

Political parties in the Democratic Republic of the Congo